Jonathan Michael Borwein (20 May 1951 – 2 August 2016) was a Scottish mathematician who held an appointment as Laureate Professor of mathematics at the University of Newcastle, Australia. He was a close associate of David H. Bailey, and they have been prominent public advocates of experimental mathematics.

Borwein's interests spanned pure mathematics (analysis), applied mathematics (optimization), computational mathematics (numerical and computational analysis), and high performance computing. He authored ten books, including several on experimental mathematics, a monograph on convex functions, and over 400 refereed articles. He was a co-founder in 1995 of software company MathResources, consulting and producing interactive software primarily for school and university mathematics.

Borwein was also an expert on the number pi and especially its computation.

Early life and education
Borwein was born in St. Andrews, Scotland in 1951 into a Jewish family. His father was mathematician David Borwein, with whom he collaborated. His brother Peter Borwein was also a mathematician.

Borwein was married to Judith, and had three daughters.

He received his B.A. (Honours Math) from University of Western Ontario in 1971, and his D.Phil. from Oxford University in 1974 as a Rhodes Scholar at Jesus College.

Career

Prior to joining Simon Fraser University in 1993, he worked at Dalhousie University (1974–91), Carnegie-Mellon (1980–82) and the University of Waterloo (1991–93).
He was Shrum Professor of Science (1993–2003) and a Canada Research Chair in Information Technology (2001–08) at Simon Fraser University, where he was founding Director of the Centre for Experimental and Constructive Mathematics and developed the Inverse Symbolic Calculator together with his brother and Simon Plouffe. In 2004, he (re-)joined the Faculty of Computer Science at Dalhousie University as a Canada Research Chair in Distributed and Collaborative Research, cross-appointed in Mathematics, while preserving an adjunct appointment at Simon Fraser.

Borwein was Governor at large of the Mathematical Association of America (2004–07), was president of the Canadian Mathematical Society (2000–02) and chair of (the Canadian National Science Library) NRC-CISTI Advisory Board (2000–2003). He served as chair of various NATO scientific programs. He was also Chair of the Scientific Advisory Committee of the Australian Mathematical Sciences Institute (AMSI). He chaired the Canadian HPC consortium, later Compute Canada, and the International Mathematical Union's Committee on Electronic Information and Communications (2002–2008).

Awards
Borwein received various awards including the Chauvenet Prize (1993), Fellowship in the Royal Society of Canada (1994), Fellowship in the American Association for the Advancement of Science (2002), an honorary degree from Limoges (1999), and foreign membership in the Bulgarian Academy of Sciences (2003). He was elected as a Fellow to the Australian Academy of Science (2010). In 2014, he became a Fellow of the American Mathematical Society. He was an ISI highly cited mathematician for the period 1981–1999.

See also
 Borwein integral
 Borwein's algorithm
 List of University of Waterloo people

References

External links
Jonathan Borwein's homepage
Jonathan Borwein memorial website

The experimental mathematics homepage and blog
Researcher ID

1951 births
2016 deaths
Canadian mathematicians
Scottish mathematicians
Jewish scientists
Scottish people of Lithuanian-Jewish descent
Fellows of the Royal Society of Canada
Canadian Rhodes Scholars
People from St Andrews
British expatriate academics in Canada
Academic staff of the Dalhousie University
Canada Research Chairs
Alumni of Jesus College, Oxford
Variational analysts
Academic staff of the University of Newcastle (Australia)
Academic staff of the University of Waterloo
Fellows of the American Mathematical Society
Fellows of the Australian Academy of Science
Presidents of the Canadian Mathematical Society